KLFF (89.3 FM, "Family Life Radio 89.3") is a non-commercial radio station that is licensed to and serves San Luis Obispo, California. The station is owned by Family Life Broadcasting and broadcasts the contemporary Christian music format of the nationally syndicated Family Life Radio network.

History
KLFF was first signed on September 3, 1995 by Logos Broadcasting Corporation. From the beginning, KLFF aired a contemporary Christian music format branded as "K-Life".

In January 2015, KLFF was rebranded from "K-Life" to "Life 89.3".

In May 2016, Logos Broadcasting sold KLFF to Family Life Broadcasting for $400,000. On August 20,  the new owner flipped the station to its Family Life Radio network, originating from KFLT-FM in Tucson, Arizona.

KLFH
KLFF was formerly rebroadcast on repeater KLFH in Ojai, California on 89.5 FM, covering the Oxnard—Ventura area. In early 2014, KLFH was sold to Southern California Public Radio, the organization that operates KPCC in Pasadena.

References

External links

Contemporary Christian radio stations in the United States
Mass media in San Luis Obispo County, California
Radio stations established in 1995
1995 establishments in California
Family Life Radio stations
LFF